Graham Osborne may refer to:

 Graham Osborne (footballer, born 1947), Australian rules footballer for Melbourne
 Graham Osborne (footballer, born 1963), Australian rules footballer for Fitzroy